Kanine may refer to:

Kaninë, settlement in the Vlorë County of southwestern Albania
Kanine Records, independent record label

See also
Canine (disambiguation)
K9 (disambiguation)